Daniel Sentacruz Ensemble was an Italian pop group formed in 1974. Their first single "Soleado", a semi-instrumental track written by lead singer Ciro Dammicco and Dario Baldan Bembo, sold over five million copies in Europe, giving the band international popularity. In 1976 and in 1978 Daniel Sentacruz Ensemble entered the Sanremo Music Festival with the songs "Linda Bella Linda" (peaking number three on the Italian chart) and "1/2 notte". Unable to replicate their initial success, the group eventually disbanded in 1980.

Band members 
 Ciro Dammicco – vocals (1974–1979)
 Mara Cubeddu – vocals (1974–1979)
 Linda Lee – vocals (1974–1979)

 Gianni Minuti Muffolini – vocals, guitar (1974–1979)
 Angelo Santori – keyboard (1974–1975)
 Stefano Dammicco – keyboard (1977–1979)
 Bruno Santori – keyboard (1974–1976)
 Gianni Calabria – drums (1974–1979)
 Savino Grieco – bass guitar, vocals (1974–1979)

Discography 
Albums
 1974 – Soleado (EMI Italiana 3C 064-18037)
 1975 – Dos (EMI Italiana 3C 064-18102)
 1977 – Daniel Sentacruz Ensemble (EMI Italiana 3C 064-18249)
 1979 – Diventiamo più amici (EMI Italiana 3C 064-18399)

References

External links
 
 

Musical groups established in 1974
Italian pop music groups
Musical groups disestablished in 1980
Musical groups from Milan